A list of books and essays about George Lucas:

Jones, Brian Jay (2016). George Lucas. Headline. ISBN 9781472224316.

Star Wars series

Lucas
George Lucas